The 2007 Rugby World Cup was played in France between 7 September and 20 October 2007. Each of the 20 competing nations was required to confirm their 30-man squad by 14 August. United States player Thretton Palamo, aged 18 when the teams were named and 8 days past his 19th birthday when he made his only appearance in the competition, was the youngest to ever take part at a World Cup final stage.

Pool A

England
Final squad released on 13 August 2007. Jamie Noon was sent home injured on 15 September; he was replaced by Newcastle Falcons team-mate, Toby Flood. After Josh Lewsey was injured in the semi-final against France, Nick Abendanon was called up as cover.

Head coach:  Brian Ashton

Samoa
Final squad announced on 29 August 2007.
Filipo Levi and Donald Kerslake were replaced by Tani Fuga and Alfie Vaeluaga before the tournament
Sailosi Tagicakibau replaced Anitelia Tuilagi, ahead of the Tonga game.
Fosi Pala'amo was called in to replace Justin Va'a for the England game.
Na'ama Leleimalefaga was called into the squad to replace Fosi Pala'amo for the USA game.

Head coach:  Michael Jones

South Africa
Squad released 21 July 2007

Pierre Spies was withdrawn from the squad after developing a condition believed to be a pulmonary embolism, with Bismarck du Plessis taking his place, although one specialist disputed the diagnosis. A third specialist confirmed the original diagnosis, and Spies remained off the team.

On 10 September, after South Africa's match against Samoa, Jean de Villiers was ruled out of the rest of the World Cup with a torn left biceps suffered in that match. Wayne Julies replaced him on the squad.

On 1 October, Jannie du Plessis, older brother of Bismarck du Plessis, replaced BJ Botha, who tore knee ligaments in South Africa's last pool match against the United States.

Head coach:  Jake White

Tonga
Squad announced on 10 August 2007 Kisi Pulu replaced Mosese Moala, while Maama Molitika was called up to replace Paino Hehea ahead of the England game.

Head coach:  Quddus Fielea

United States
Squad released 14 August 2007 John van der Giessen was called up to replace Luke Gross.

Head coach:  Peter Thorburn

The following players are in reserve in case of injury.

Pool B

Australia
Squad announced 23 July 2007. Mark Gerrard was injured in the opening game and replaced by Cameron Shepherd. Morgan Turinui was called up on October 1, 2007 to replace Number 8 David Lyons.

Head coach:  John Connolly

The following players are on reserve in case of injuries in the main squad

Canada
Final squad announced 15 August 2007. Josh Jackson replaced Jamie Cudmore who was ruled out with a broken bone in his hand.

Head coach:  Ric Suggitt

Fiji
Final squad announced 22 July 2007. Filimoni Bolavucu was ruled out of the tournament and was replaced by Sireli Bobo.

Head coach:  Ilivasi Tabua

Japan
Squad released 11 August 2007. Mitsugu Yamamoto replaced by Yusuke Aoki on 21 August. Daisuke Ohata tore his left Achilles tendon in Japan's final warm-up against Portugal, and was replaced by Tomoki Kitagawa.

Head coach:  John Kirwan

The following players are on reserve in case of injury.

Wales
Squad announced 10 August 2007

Head coach:  Gareth Jenkins

Pool C

Italy
Squad released 16 August 2007. Carlo Del Fava withdrew due to injury on 17 August. Fabio Staibano was originally announced as his replacement, but he was in turn ruled out due to injury. Del Fava was later ruled fit to play, and was restored to the squad on 27 August. Silvio Orlando replaced Robert Barbieri after he was ruled out due to injury in a warm-up game.

Head coach:  Pierre Berbizier

New Zealand
Squad announced 22 July 2007

Head coach:  Graham Henry

Portugal
Squad announced 15 August 2007

Head coach:  Tomaz Morais

Romania
Squad announced 14 August 2007

Head coach:  Daniel Santamans

Scotland
Squad announced 14 August 2007. On 11 September, his 24th birthday, Alasdair Dickinson was called up to the Scotland squad to replace the injured Allan Jacobsen.

Head coach:  Frank Hadden

Pool D

Argentina
Squad released 28 July 2007 from Planet-Rugby. Additional information from Unión Argentina de Rugby.

Martín Gaitán was forced to withdraw from the squad on 18 August after it was discovered he had a blocked artery in his heart, and was replaced by Hernán Senillosa. José María Núñez Piossek was forced to withdraw from the squad due to injury on 30 August, and was replaced by Federico Martín Aramburú. Mario Ledesma was forced to withdraw from the squad for the third-place match against France due to injury on 15 October, and was replaced by Eusebio Guiñazú.

Head coach:  Marcelo Loffreda

France
Provisional squad announced 14 June 2007, from Planet-Rugby. Elvis Vermeulen replaced by Thierry Dusautoir due to injury on 21 June Planet-Rugby. Sylvain Marconnet was replaced due to injury by Nicolas Mas on 20 August BBC Sport.

Head coach:  Bernard Laporte

The following players are on reserve in case of withdrawals from the squad.

Georgia
Final squad released on 9 August 2007 from Planet-Rugby, other details from Georgian RFU

Head coach:  Malkhaz Cheishvili

Ireland
Squad listed from BBC Sport 12 August 2007, further information from Irish Rugby Football Union.

Head coach:  Eddie O'Sullivan

Namibia
Squad released 18 July 2007 from Planet-Rugby, additional information from Namibian Rugby and South Africa Rugby.

Head coach:  Hakkies Husselman

Notes and references

Squads
Rugby World Cup squads